Musical Futures is a not-for-profit music education program, pedagogy and resource platform built for teachers, children and youths. It was started in the United Kingdom in 2003 by the Paul Hamlyn Foundation and is now an internationally recognised enterprise.

Background 
The Musical Futures journey began in 2003 when the Paul Hamlyn Foundation, an independent grant-making foundation, instigated an initiative to find new and imaginative ways of engaging all young people, aged 11–18, in meaningful music activities. The starting point for Musical Futures was to understand the factors affecting the apparent disengagement of young people with sustained musicmaking activities, at a time in their lives when music is not only a passion for many young people, but plays a big part in shaping their social identity. A year of consultation was followed by two years of ‘Pathfinder’ action research projects, where teams in Leeds, Nottingham and Hertfordshire trialled a number of learning models to find ways of engaging all young people in music-making, both in and out of school. The pathfinders were Music Services working in partnership with young people, schools, universities, professional music organisations and community music organisations. Alongside this, a number of research and development projects were also commissioned. Following the development of tried-and-tested models, the first set of teacher resource materials were published in 2006 and made available free of charge. The following provides a brief outline of the pathfinders, research and development partners, and where to find further information. 

In 2018, Musical Futures were selected in HundrED's top 100 Global education innovations.

Musical Futures Online
In January 2021, Musical Futures unveiled their new resource platform, Musical Futures Online. The subscription-based website contains thousands of audio & visual learning resources built for classroom and home use. Teachers and music professionals can subscribe to the platform though any of the 3 membership plans, Standard (ideal for Primary teaching), Premium (ideal for Primary & Secondary teaching) and Ultimate (ideal for Secondary teaching with technology). 

The platform features a wide range of resources to support teachers in delivering music from ages 7 – 16 (Key Stages 2 – 4 in the UK). All resources are developed, tested and refined by teachers and practitioners in their own settings.

Resource Categories 

 LearnToPlay - Whole-class music making for popular classroom instruments including ukulele, guitar, keyboard and tuned percussion
 LearnToPlay Songbook - Library of popular feel-good songs featuring how-to-play videos. Available for guitar, keyboard, ukulele and tuned percussion
 MakingMusic - Features four teaching resources designed to develop core musical skills that help create a solid foundation upon which to build
 Body Percussion
 Untuned Percussion
 Classroom Collection
 ChairDrumming
 SimplySamba
 Find Your Voice - An engaging approach to vocal work in the classroom. Suitable for all ages, this collection includes: Warm-ups, group games, vocal exercises, beatboxing & tasks using mobile technology
 JustPlay - Musical Futures' most popular resource, JustPlay provides whole-class music making opportunities for popular classroom instruments. Includes video guides that combines ukulele, guitar, bass, keyboard and vocals in one resource
 Playalong Library - Follows JustPlay. A library of video playalongs for 80+ songs including pop music, selected music by exam boards, film music and more. Search by difficulty or genre
 Music Production - Comprehensive video tutorials and resources to help students produce a trap track using the web-based sequencer BandLab
 Intro course
 Advanced course
 InsideRap - Created especially for Musical Futures by a performing rap artist, this resource offers the support for learners to create an authentic piece of rap music
 In The Style Of - Series of downloadable audio sample packs in the style of various World-famous artists with a series of tasks to create a remix
 Serato DJ Course - Created in collaboration with Education & Bass, this resource uses the free Serato DJ lite software and shows how student can DJ with a series of video tutorials

Learning models

Informal learning in the music classroom
Lucy Green, the Institute of Education and Hertfordshire Music Service developed a self-directed, independent learning music education program. Students work in small groups on a series of musical tasks. This draws on the real-life learning practices of professional musicians.

Whole curriculum approach
Nottingham City Music Service developed a program for Year 7-8 students.  It puts the students in real musical activities and environments. It aims to draw together practice from classroom, instrumental and extra-curricular music into an integrated package for students.

Personalising extra-curricular learning
Education Leeds Artforms created a program to help young people to make choices about the music they engage with beyond the classroom.

External links
 Musical Futures Online
Musical Futures International
 Musical Futures UK
 Paul Hamlyn Foundation
 National Curriculum

References

Research 

 Music Educators Consider Musical Futures
 Musical Futures in Ireland: findings from a pilot study in primary and secondary schools
 Perceptions of the informal learning branch of Musical Futures
 Musical Futures: Informal learning in the classroom
 The perceptions of non music staff and senior management of the impact of the implementation of the Musical Futures approach on the whole school
 Aspiring to Music Making as Leisure through the Musical Futures Classroom

Music education organizations